Vahl is a surname. Notable people with the surname include:

Christian-Friedrich Vahl (born 1955), German cardiac surgeon
Emanuel Vahl (born 1938), Ukrainian-Israeli composer
Herbert-Ernst Vahl, German SS general
Jens Vahl (1796–1854), Danish botanist and pharmacist, botanical authority abbreviation J.Vahl
Martin Vahl (1749–1804), Danish-Norwegian botanist and zoologist, botanical authority abbreviation Vahl

See also
Wahl (disambiguation)
Waal (disambiguation)
Wael
Wahle
Wahlen
Vahlen